George Mihalik (born May 22, 1952) is an American football coach and former player.  He served as the head football coach at Slippery Rock University of Pennsylvania from 1988 to 2015, compiling a record of 197–111–4.  Mihalik retired following the 2015 season, in which he led The Rock to its best record in school history at 12–2, an NCAA Quarterfinals appearance, a second consecutive Pennsylvania State Athletic Conference (PSAC) championship, and a third consecutive PSAC West Division title.

Mihalik was a three-year letterman at Slippery Rock, playing quarterback from 1971 to 1973.  He served as a graduate assistant at the University of Kentucky for one season in 1976 and then was an assistant coach at Slippery Rock for 11 seasons before being promoted to head coach. George Mihalik was a brother of Alpha Sigma Phi while attending Slippery Rock University in the 1970s.

Head coaching record

References

External links
 Slippery Rock profile

1952 births
Living people
American football quarterbacks
Kentucky Wildcats football coaches
Slippery Rock football coaches
Slippery Rock football players